Revelations is the third studio album by American singer-songwriter Shamir, released on Father/Daughter Records on November 3, 2017. The album was recorded in May 2017 in his hometown of Las Vegas.

Track listing
All tracks written by Shamir Bailey, except "90's Kids", written by Shamir Bailey & Theresa Harris.
 "Games"
 "You Have A Song"
 "90's Kids"
 "Her Story"
 "Blooming"
 "Cloudy"
 "Float"
 "Astral Plane"
 "Straight Boy"

References

2017 albums
Shamir (musician) albums
Father/Daughter Records albums